Lupita Ferrer (born December 6, 1947) is a Venezuelan theater,  film and television actress. She is known as a "Queen" of telenovelas and one of the most famous Spanish speaking telenovela actresses of all time.

Biography
Ferrer was born as Yolanda Guadalupe Ferrer in Maracaibo to Spanish immigrant parents. She became known for her beauty (especially her large and expressive eyes) and her strong theatrical presence.

Ferrer has a theatrical background. She started at the age of 15 performing in Shakespeare's "Hamlet" as Ofelia. At the age of 18, then Venezuelan President Raul Leoni saw her performing in the piece "Dona Rosita La Soltera" ("Dona Rosita, the single one"), and was greatly impressed by her talent.

In the 1960s Ferrer worked in many Mexican and Venezuelan-Mexican film co-productions next to actors like Mario Moreno "Cantinflas", and during the 1970s worked in Hollywood movies sharing the screen with actors like Tony Curtis.

Her first telenovelas were Esmeralda, about a blind young woman, Mariana de la Noche (1975), about the forbidden love of Mariana Montenegro and Ignacio Lugo Navarro (José Bardina), María Teresa, a woman who goes insane after the loss of her little daughter, La Zulianita, Pecados Ajenos, and Cristal.

She lives in Miami.

She was married to the American film director Hall Bartlett for four years, who cast her alongside Anthony Quinn and the legendary Dolores del Río in his film The Children of Sanchez (1978), better known for its Grammy award winning musical score by Chuck Mangione.

In 1985 she starred in a hugely successful telenovela produced in Venezuela by Radio Caracas Television named "Cristal" where she impersonates Victoria Ascanio, a very humble girl who after a brief forced encounter with a priest-to-be young man gets pregnant and is forced to leave her baby girl away after delivering her. Years after she comes back as the owner of a high couture clothes designing company which she rules with an iron fist. She hires a very beautiful girl who, after many plot devices applied, she discovers is her long lost daughter, whose estrangement make Victoria feel guilty and bittered. Cristal was a big success in South America, the U.S., Europe and Asia and was dubbed in many languages.

In 2006, Ferrer made a comeback in the American drama series Ugly Betty, in which she played an actress in a telenovela who gets into a fight with a nurse on the show played by (Ugly Betty series creator) Salma Hayek. In 2007, Ferrer participated in Telemundo's Pecados Ajenos, which has since become a cult classic, as the main villain, the evil Agata Mercenario. In 2010, Ferrer participated in Univision Studios - Eva Luna as Justa Valdéz.  In 2012, Ferrer also acted a telenovela by the name "Rosa Diamante" (Precious Rose), playing the character Rosaura Sotomayor. In this telenovela, she played alongside Carla Hernandez who was her long lost daughter after she had abandoned her at a boarding school.

Filmography

Films

Television

Discography
1992: Tiemblo
1970: Esmeralda

References

External links

Lupita Ferrer in VenCOR

1947 births
Living people
People from Maracaibo
Venezuelan expatriates in the United States
Venezuelan people of Catalan descent
Venezuelan film actresses
Venezuelan telenovela actresses
Venezuelan stage actresses
Venezuelan television actresses
20th-century Venezuelan actresses
21st-century Venezuelan actresses
Venezuelan people of Spanish descent